Sterneurus is a genus of leaf beetles in the subfamily Eumolpinae. It is distributed in South America.

Species
Species in the genus include:
 Sterneurus balyi Bechyné, 1957
 Sterneurus berylinus Bechyné, 1951
 Sterneurus fulgidus Lefèvre, 1875
 Sterneurus lateralis Lefèvre, 1875
 Sterneurus penetrans Bechyné, 1957
 Sterneurus viridicatus Bechyné, 1957

References

Eumolpinae
Chrysomelidae genera
Beetles of South America
Taxa named by Édouard Lefèvre